Kichepo are a surmic ethnic group of South Sudan and the Southern Nations, Nationalities, and People's Region of Ethiopia.  They speak Kichepo, a dialect of Kacipo-Balesi, which is part of the Surmic language family. The population of this group is above 10,000.

References

Ethnic groups in Ethiopia
Ethnic groups in South Sudan